Pressure is the tenth studio album by American rapper Jeezy. It was released on December 15, 2017, by YJ Music, Inc., under exclusive license to Def Jam Recordings. The album features guest appearances from Kendrick Lamar, J. Cole, 2 Chainz, Puff Daddy and Kodak Black, among others. The album was supported by three official singles: "Bottles Up" featuring Puff Daddy, "Cold Summer" featuring Tee Grizzley and "This Is It".

Background
On November 30, 2017, the album was teased with a trailer via Jeezy's Instagram. The teaser revealed the album's title and release date. The tracklist was later revealed on December 6, 2017.

Singles
The album's lead single, "Bottles Up" featuring Puff Daddy was released on October 27, 2017. The album's second single, "Cold Summer" featuring Tee Grizzley was released on November 3, 2017.

The first and second promotional singles, "Spyder" and "American Dream" featuring J. Cole and Kendrick Lamar were released simultaneously on December 14, 2017.

Critical reception

At Metacritic, Pressure received a score of 66 out of 100 from four reviews, indicating "generally favorable reception".

Andy Kellman of AllMusic expressed a mixed response describing the album as a "routine follow up to Trap or Die 3", stating "Jeezy doesn't deviate from his standard set of themes. He's still rhyming about his rise from the bottom, the product he's shifting, and all the disposable wealth and women that have come with it, all the while castigating would-be detractors and snitches".

Commercial performance
Pressure debuted at number six on the US Billboard 200 with 72,000 album-equivalent units, of which 54,000 were pure album sales. It is Jeezy's ninth consecutive US top 10 album since 2005.

Track listing
Credits were adapted from the album's liner notes.

Notes
  signifies a co-producer
  signifies an additional producer
  signifies an uncredited producer

Sample credits
 "Cold Summer" contains excerpts from "Street Fame", written by Tupac Shakur and Delmar Arnaud, as performed by 2Pac.
 "Bottles Up" contains interpolations from "Tear Da Club Up", written by Paul Beauregard, Ricky Dunigan, Lola Mitchell and Jordan Houston, as performed by Three 6 Mafia.
 "Valet Interlude" contains samples from "For You", written by Shirleen Aubert and Kevin Grady, as performed by Lushus Daim & the Pretty Vain.
 "Like Them" contains a sample from Frank Dukes' original composition "Amby".
 "The Life" contains a sample from Frank Dukes' original composition "Emoboy".
 "American Dream" contains samples from "Flying", written by Bilal Oliver and Dominick Lamb, as performed by Bilal.
 "Snow Season" contains excerpts from "Northern Lights", performed by Stellardrone.

Personnel
Credits were adapted from the album's liner notes.

Performers
 Jeezy – primary artist
 Tee Grizzley – featured artist 
 Payroll Giovanni – featured artist 
 2 Chainz – featured artist 
 Puff Daddy – featured artist 
 Kodak Black – featured artist 
 YG – featured artist 
 Tory Lanez – featured artist 
 Rick Ross – featured artist 
 Wizkid – featured artist 
 Trey Songz – featured artist 
 J. Cole – featured artist 
 Kendrick Lamar – featured artist 

Technical
 Mike Bozzi – mastering engineer 
 John Scott – recording engineer , mixing engineer 
 Matt Testa – recording engineer 
 Finis "KY" White – recording engineer 
 Thomas "Tomcat" Bennett – recording engineer 
 Karl Heilbron – recording engineer 
 Mez – recording engineer 
 Matt Schaeffer – recording engineer 
 Derek "MixedbyAli" Ali – recording engineer 
 Derek Garcia – recording engineer 
 Johann Chavez – recording engineer 
 Tony Rey – recording engineer 

Instruments
 Jesse Brotter – bass 
 John Scott – piano 
 William Mallard – horn 
 Dorsey Minns, Jr. – horn 
 Daniel Szczepanski – horn 
 Ryan Leslie – piano 

Production
 D. Rich – producer 
 P.C. – producer 
 Gotti Rock Solid – producer 
 Vinylz – producer 
 Big White – co-producer 
 DJ Spinking – additional producer 
 Djay Cas – producer 
 Neenyo – producer 
 Tone Mason – producer 
 Frank Dukes – co-producer 
 Cardiak – producer 
 Soundsmith Productions – producer 
 Chigz – producer 

Misc
 Piotr Lato - horn arranger 

Managerial
 Roland "DJ Folk" Bailey – A&R
 Tab Nkhereanye – A&R
 Leesa D. Brunson – A&R operations
 Terese Joseph – A&R administration
 Brittany Mansfield – A&R coordination
 Agency99 – management
 Rob Caiaffa – marketing
 Angel Martinez – product manager
 Chelsea Donini – digital manager
 Tai Linzie – art production
 Andy Proctor – package production
 Sedlmayr & Associates – legal counsel
 Deborah Mannis-Gardner – clearance agent
 Cindy Zaplachinski – business affairs
 Antoinette Trotman – business affairs
 Ian Allen – business affairs
 Jamie Sudhalter – business affairs
 Vol Davis III – business affairs

Charts

References

2017 albums
Jeezy albums
Def Jam Recordings albums